Kenneth Shawn Patterson (born June 13, 1964) is a former professional American football defensive end and nose tackle. He played for five seasons in the National Football League (NFL) for the Green Bay Packers.

1964 births
Living people
Sportspeople from Tempe, Arizona
Players of American football from Arizona
American football defensive ends
Arizona State Sun Devils football players
Green Bay Packers players